Wings Gaming was a Chinese Dota 2 esports team based in Chongqing. They were best known for winning over US$9 million at The International 2016 (TI6), which was one of the most lucrative esports tournaments in history. Wings were founded in the aftermath of post-The International 2014 roster shuffles in China, with the TI6 winning roster being put together in August 2015.

Wings were nominated in the best non-Olympic athlete category of the 2016 Chinese Top 10 Laureus Sport Awards, becoming the first esports team to be nominated. They were also nominated as esports team of the year at The Game Awards 2016. Just before the team played at the Kiev Major tournament in April 2017, all five of the playing members left the team, playing under the banner of Team Random at the event. Team Random disbanded following a bottom placed finish at the event, with most of the members taking a break from the professional scene. The team briefly reunited for an exhibition match at the Chongqing Major in 2019.

Former roster

Notable achievements

2015
 17–20th – Dota 2 Asia Championships

2016
 1st – ESL One Manila 2016
 13–16th – Manila Major
 2nd – Nanyang Dota 2 Championships Season 2
 1st – The Summit 5
 1st – The International 2016
 1st – Nanyang Cruise Cup
 1st – Northern Arena BEAT Invitational
 4th – The Summit 6
 9–16th – Boston Major

2017
 3–4th – ESL One Genting
 9th–12th – Dota 2 Asia Champions 2017

References

Defunct and inactive Dota teams
Esports teams established in 2014
Esports teams disestablished in 2017
Esports teams based in China
2014 establishments in China
Organizations based in Chongqing
2017 disestablishments in China